Niyyah (Arabic: نِيَّةٌ, variously transliterated niyyah, niyya , "intention") is an Islamic concept: the intention in one's heart to do an act for the sake of God (Allah).

The general Islamic principle of Niyah i.e. Intention is laid out in Chapter 33 (Al-Ahzab) of the Holy Quran in Ayat (Verse) 5, which goes as:

Chapter 33, Verse 5:

‘’….There is no blame on you for what you do by mistake, but (only) for what you do intentionally. And Allah is All-Forgiving, Most Merciful.’’

According to Ibn Rajab's Commentary on Imam Nawawi's Forty Hadith: Hadith #1, actions are judged according to intentions: "'Umar b. al-Khattab narrated that the Prophet said: Deeds are [a result] only of the intentions [of the actor], and an individual is [rewarded] only according to that which he intends."

Correspondingly, one's niyyah or intention is of the utmost importance among the requirements of an act of ritual prayer. There is some debate as to the necessity of an audible utterance of niyyah. Most scholars agree, however, that as niyyah is spoken from the heart, it does not have to be uttered. Additionally, there is no evidence that the Islamic prophet Muhammad or any of his companions ever uttered a niyyah aloud before prayer.

A Muslim must have niyyah before commencing salat (prayer), and in order to commence the Hajj (pilgrimage to Mecca).

See also 
 Kavanah, a similar concept in Judaism

References

Salah
Arabic words and phrases
Salah terminology